Ame-no-Koyane-no-mikoto (天児屋命, 天児屋根命) is a kami and a male deity in Japanese mythology and Shinto. He is the ancestral god of the Nakatomi clan, and Fujiwara no Kamatari, the founder of the powerful Fujiwara clan. An Amatsukami, 'Kami of heaven', he resides in Takamagahara.

Mythology 
According to Kogo Shūi and Kashima Shrine’s genealogy, Ame-no-Koyane is the son of the creator deity Kamimusubi, one of the first three gods to come into existence. However, according to Nihon Shoki, he is the son of Kogotomusubi.

According to Nihon Shoki, Ame-no-Koyane was "the first in charge of divine affairs, for which reason he was made to serve by performing the Greater Divination." He was commanded by Amaterasu to guard the divine mirror, and was known as the "Imperial Aide" at the Imperial Palace, being in charge of divine affairs of the palace.

According to Japanese mythology, Ame-no-Koyane performed a ritual prayer to the sun goddess Amaterasu to call her out of the cave of Amano-Iwato and bring light back to the world, after Susanoo, the god of storms, drove her away. During tenson kōrin, he acted as one of the five gods descending from heaven accompanying Ninigi, thus becoming the ancestor of Nakatomi clan.

Shrines 
Ame-no-Koyane is worshipped at:

 Kasuga Grand Shrine
 Hiraoka Shrine
 Yoshida Shrine
 Ōharano Shrine
 and all Kasuga Shrines in Japan.

References

External links
http://eos.kokugakuin.ac.jp - Encyclopedia of Shinto
Ameno Koyane - History of Japan Database

Japanese gods
Shinto kami
Amatsukami